Willmar Municipal Airport , also known as John L. Rice Field, is a city-owned public-use airport located west of the central business district of Willmar, a city in Kandiyohi County, Minnesota, United States. The airport opened in 2006 and is located two miles west of a closed airport which operated under the same name .

Although most U.S. airports use the same three-letter location identifier for the FAA and IATA, Willmar Municipal Airport is assigned BDH by the FAA and ILL by IATA; BDH is used by the IATA for  Bandar Lengeh Airport in Bandar Lengeh, Iran.

Facilities and aircraft 
Willmar Municipal Airport has two runways: 13/31 with a 5,500 x 100 ft. (1,676 x 30 m) asphalt pavement and 3/21 with a 3,000 x 250 ft. (914 x 76 m) turf surface.

Earlier airport
The first Willmar Municipal Airport was established in 1934 as a federal work relief project of the National Youth Administration during the New Deal.

Historical Scheduled Service 
 In October 1935 Watertown Airways, Inc offered scheduled service between Minneapolis–St. Paul International Airport and Watertown, South Dakota.  This route continued through South Dakota with additional stops in Huron, Pierre, Phillip, Rapid City, and Spearfish. Service was provided using Travel Air high wing cabin monoplanes.
 In December 1972 Mississippi Valley Airlines had scheduled service to Minneapolis–St. Paul International Airport and Alexandria, Minnesota

References

External links 
 
  
  

Airports in Minnesota
Buildings and structures in Kandiyohi County, Minnesota
New Deal in Minnesota
Transportation in Kandiyohi County, Minnesota
Willmar, Minnesota